Noreia ajaia is a moth of the family Geometridae first described by Francis Walker in 1859. Its geographical range includes areas from the Oriental regions of India and Sri Lanka to Singapore and Sundaland.

The adult has brownish-grey wings. In the hindwings, the postmedial is distinctly rounded. The caterpillar greenish with a long, thin, cylindrical body. It rests at 45 degrees with a stick-like posture. Host plants include Mimusops species.

References

External links
Assemblage of Macromoth (Lepidoptera: Heterocera) in Arboretum UNIMAS

Moths of Asia
Moths described in 1859